Scandone may refer to:

Nick Scandone (1966–2009), American yachtsman
S.S. Felice Scandone, also known for sponsorship reasons as Sidigas Avellino, Italian professional basketball club based in Avellino